The 2018–19 Lesotho Premier League is the 51st season of the Lesotho Premier League, the top-tier football league in Lesotho, since its establishment in 1970. The season started on 15 September 2018.

Standings
Final table.

References

Football leagues in Lesotho
Premier League
Premier League
Lesotho